Silvia Quandt is a German artist.

Early life
Quandt was born in 1937 in Berlin, the only child of the marriage between German industrialist Herbert Quandt, a man who was eventually the major shareholder of BMW, and his first wife Ursel Munstermann.  Her parents divorced in 1940 and Silvia stayed with her mother.

Artistic career
She studied at the Academy for Graphic Arts in Munich and then trained as a commercial artist. She has worked as a freelance painter since the 1960s.  She received the Burda Award in 1968 and the Swabian Art Award in 1969. Works by Quandt can be seen today at the Bayrischen Staatsgemäldesammlung (Bavarian State Painting Collection) and in the Haus der Kunst Art Museum in Munich. 
Quandt's paintings and graphic works are ascribed to Fantastic Realism, characterised by a tendency towards the Surreal and Romanticism.  She has had exhibitions in Munich, Düsseldorf, Münster, Mannheim, Bremen, London, Paris and Zurich.

Personal life
Quandt lives and works in Munich. Before her father's death in 1982, she received extensive investments and property which are controlled through various private companies, in particular Silvia Quandt Capital GmbH.  While her younger siblings Susanne Klatten and Stefan Quandt (from her father's third marriage) have fortunes estimated in the billions of dollars mostly from substantial large holdings in public companies such BMW, Altana and Varta, Silvia Quandt's fortune is more difficult to estimate as it is mainly controlled through private holding companies.

References

External links
Brief biography

1937 births
Living people
Artists from Berlin
German people of Dutch descent
German artists
Silvia
German women artists